Arsène Piesset (31 July 1919 – 21 December 1987) was a French long-distance runner. He competed in the marathon at the 1948 Summer Olympics.

References

1919 births
1987 deaths
Athletes (track and field) at the 1948 Summer Olympics
French male long-distance runners
French male marathon runners
Olympic athletes of France
Place of birth missing